Noel Marasigan Comia Jr. (born May 29, 2004) is a Filipino actor, commercial model, singer, TV events host, and voice talent who won Cinemalaya's Best Actor Award 2017 for movie Kiko Boksingero (the youngest of which to do so) and joined as a contestant in the third season of The Voice Kids under Team Lea with his coach Lea Salonga. Prior to his appearance on The Voice Kids, this multi-talented child actor has appeared in numerous theater productions and TV commercials.

He is dubbed as the 'wonderboy' as he is excellent not just in the field of performing arts, but in the field of music as well, as he can play several musical instruments.

Personal life 
Noel Comia Jr. was born to Filipino businessman Noel C. Comia and Elisa M. Comia.

when he was 6 years old, his parents took notice of his musical talents as he belted out songs on their karaoke machine, and playing harmonies on several musical instruments. His parents then decided to take him to music and theater acting workshops to further develop his talent for music and acting.

In 2011, at the age of 6, Noel Jr attended his first musical theater class in 'Kids Acts Philippines' TheCampArt Performing School, a professional children's theater company in the Philippines. There, he was trained as a scholar and has been a student and actor of the theater company ever since.

Career 
Noel Jr. began his career in musical theater and commercial modeling, first appearing as the lead role in a television commercial for a popular powdered milk brand.

At 7 years old, he was cast as a member of the ensemble for KAPI's theater production of the popular childhood fairytale, "Hansel and Gretel". This experience fueled his passion for theater and acting, and since then, he has performed in more than 20 theater productions.

On top of theater performance and modeling, Noel Comia Jr. is also a talented singer, and was a part of The Voice Kids (Philippines season 3). He was one of Team Lea's top 8 artists, and was eliminated in the Sing-offs part of the competition.

In March 2017, Noel Jr., together with his fellow The Voice Kids alum and label mate Elha Nympha, released a cover duet of John Legend and Ariana Grande's "Beauty and the Beast" produced by MCA Music Inc.

In August 2017, he released a cover of "The Show" by Lenka. at the age of 12, Noel Jr. was awarded the Best Actor Award at the Cinemalaya 2017 for his performance in the independent Filipino film Kiko Boksingero. He is currently the youngest person to receive the award.

He was cast as "Jeremy Potts" in the Manila production of Ian Fleming's "Chitty Chitty Bang Bang" at the Newport Performing Arts Theater in Resorts World Manila which opened October 27, 2017.

In 2018, he participated in the second season of Your Face Sounds Familiar Kids.

In 2021, Noel is now on TV5 for his new and also his 1st acting teleserye drama series, "Nina Niño," with co-stars Teleserye "Primetime Majesty" Maja Salvador, and Empoy Marquez. He also starred in the Thriller "Tenement 66," with co-stars Francine Diaz and Francis Magundayao.

Filmography

Television Appearances

Movies/Short Films/Indie Films

TV Commercials/Online Ads/Print Ads

Music Videos

Stage credits

Discography

Singles

Accolades

References

External links

2004 births
Living people
The Voice Kids (Philippine TV series) contestants
Filipino male child actors
Filipino child singers
21st-century Filipino male singers